The Sub–Junior Girl's National Football Championship is an Indian football girls tournament held for under 17 players. The competition is held every year between the teams representing state associations of India under AIFF. The tournament was instituted by the AIFF in 2003 with the first edition held at Ooty in Tamil Nadu.

The latest edition held in 2019 at Cuttack was won by Jharkhand.

Results
The following is the list of winners and runners-up:

References

Football cup competitions in India
Youth football in India
Youth football competitions